Daniel 'Danny' Docherty (born 12 April 1961) was a Scottish footballer who played for Morton, Clyde, Dumbarton and Queen of the South.

References

1961 births
Scottish footballers
Dumbarton F.C. players
Greenock Morton F.C. players
Clyde F.C. players
Queen of the South F.C. players
Scottish Football League players
Living people
Cambuslang Rangers F.C. players
Association football midfielders